Franz Macoun (7 September 1881 in Nová Ves – 6 October 1951) was a German Social Democratic trade unionist and politician from the Czech Lands. He joined the Social Democratic Party in 1899. From 1903 onwards he was trade union organizer. Between 1920 and 1938 he served as the General Secretary of the Central Commission of German Trade Unions in the Czechoslovak Republic. Between 1929 and 1938 he was a member of the Czechoslovak National Assembly, on behalf of the German Social Democratic Workers Party in the Czechoslovak Republic. In 1938 he was arrested, following the German occupation of Czechoslovakia. In 1947 he emigrated from Prague to Sweden.

References

1881 births
1951 deaths
People from Liberec District
People from the Kingdom of Bohemia
German Bohemian people
Social Democratic Party of Austria politicians
German Social Democratic Workers' Party in the Czechoslovak Republic politicians
Members of the Chamber of Deputies of Czechoslovakia (1929–1935)
Members of the Chamber of Deputies of Czechoslovakia (1935–1939)
Czechoslovak trade unionists
Czechoslovak emigrants to Sweden